Balerno (IPA:[ˈpaleˈɛːɾʲnəx]; Scots: Balerno or Balernie) is a village on the outskirts of Edinburgh, Scotland situated  south-west of the city centre, next to Currie and then Juniper Green. Traditionally in the county of Midlothian it now administratively falls within the jurisdiction of the City of Edinburgh Council. The village lies at the confluence of the Water of Leith and the Bavelaw Burn. In the 18th and 19th century, the area was home to several mills using waterpower. In the 20th century, the mills closed and the village now forms a residential suburb of Edinburgh.

History 
Balerno's name derives from the Scottish Gaelic Baile Àirneach, meaning "townland/town of the hawthorns". The earliest written records of Balhernoch or Balernach are found in the late 13th century.

The 18th century brought substantial development to the area, with several new flax, snuff and paper mills springing up around the Water of Leith and its tributary, the Bavelaw Burn (evidence of flax production can be seen in Harlaw Woods). The largest of these mills was the Balerno Bank Paper Mill which was located near the centre of the old village. The Balerno Bank Paper Mill mill was founded in 1810 and closed in the early 1990s. While the former site has been converted to housing, the former offices (built in a Scottish baronial style and lodge are still extant. They are Category B and listed respectively. On the eastern edge of Barlerno, the Malleny Mill was built in 1805 as a Flax mill.  It was later used as a grain mill but was damaged by fire internally in 1910. It repaired in 1920 and converted into a ladies school. It is now housing but is Category C listed and the mills give their name to this area of Balerno. In 1825, a Scotch whisky distillery was established in Balerno but it was shortlived and closed by 1830.

In the 19th century, the village expanded with most of the present day stone buildings on the Main St dating from this period. These include the Grey Horse Inn (circa 1850), the late 19th century Malleny Arms Hotel (now the Balerno Inn), the Balerno Hardware and Pharmacy Buildings, as well as the buildings at 28-32 and 34 Main Street. In 1877, a primary school 'Deanpark' was built in the village. While the school moved to a new building in 1970, the original school, school Masters building and late annexes still exist and the spired Bell-cot is a focal point of the centre of the village. The school was expanded on at least 3 occasions between 1880 and 1914 and the main building now serves as the village library.

After the First World War house building began in earnest in the area and since then residential development has increased ahead of commercial and industrial development. There was a short loop railway running over what is now the Water of Leith Walkway. In 1938, the Royal Bank of Scotland building was erected in the village. It is category C listed and the building is now in use as a dentists.

From 1951 onwards, Balerno was expanded with the creation of a new housing estate under the builders Mactaggart & Mickel. In 1975, the village became part of the city of Edinburgh. Also in 1975, part of the village was designated as a conservation area (with the boundaries enlarged in 1997). In 1997, the village erected a memorial to a local resident Willie Shanks (BEM) for services to the people and children of Balerno.

Governance

Local
Balerno is governed by Edinburgh City Council and also a local community council.

Scottish Parliament
Balerno is in the Edinburgh Pentlands constituency for the Scottish Parliament and the Member of the Scottish Parliament is Gordon MacDonald. Balerno is also covered by the Lothian electoral region which gives the area seven additional MSPs.

House of Commons
Balerno is represented within the constituency of Edinburgh South West in the House of Commons. The current Member of Parliament (MP) is Joanna Cherry.

Culture and Community

Malleny House & Gardens

The 17th century Malleny House and Garden are owned by the National Trust for Scotland. The house incorporates parts of an early house dated to 1589. It is thought that Sir James Murray of Kilbaberton  was the designer of the main house building. While the house is not open to the public the gardens are and consist of a  walled garden set in approximately nine acres of woodland. The gardens feature four 100-year-old yew trees known as the Four Apostles and was home to Scotland's National Bonsai Collection, which left around 2000 and is now located at Binny Plants near Ecclesmachan. The gardens are home to one of the largest rose collections in Scotland.

Scottish SPCA
The Scottish Society for the Prevention of Cruelty to Animals operates an Animal Rescue and Rehoming Centre on Mansfield Rd in Balerno. The SSPCA opened the centre in 1930 as a Rest Farm for working horses. The centre cares for and rehomes thousands of neglected and mistreated animals every year.

Farmers Market
A farmers' market is held in Balerno Main Street on the second Saturday of each month.  The Balerno Farmers Market is run by Balerno Village Trust

Balerno Village Screen
2013 saw the launch of Balerno Village Screen - a community cinema project with free admission and funded by donations. The screenings are shown monthly on the first Saturday of every month in the Ogston Hall and the St Joseph's Centre. So far around 400 villagers have turned out per screening to watch the films.

Music Festival
2008 saw the launch of Balerno's music festival with events held at Balerno Parish Church, Balerno Bowling Club, Balerno Parish Church New Hall, the Grey Horse Inn and the St Joseph's Centre.

Red Moss Wildlife Reserve
Red Moss is one of only four raised bogs of sphagnum moss surviving in the Lothians and is a Site of Special Scientific Interest. It is currently managed b y the Scottish Wildlife Trust.

Transport
See also Transport in Edinburgh

Historical
The Caledonian Railway built the Balerno line, a spur line from Slateford, via Colinton, which connected Balerno railway station to the centre of Edinburgh. The line saw an upsurge in housebuilding in Balerno. The last passenger train to run on the line was in 1943, and a High School was placed on the site of the goods station in 1983. The line runs adjacent to the Water of Leith river.

Present day
The A70 runs near the village. The village is serviced by the 44 bus route to Wallyford, which is operated by Lothian Buses. The route connects Balerno to Currie, Slateford, the City Centre, Brunstane and East Lothian. The village was also served by the E&M Horsburgh service 24 bus route, which connected it to Juniper Green in one direction and East Calder and Livingston, but this has been terminated. The village is also served by McGill's Scotland East service 63 to South Queensferry. This route connects the village to Currie, Heriot-Watt University, Gyle Centre, Kirkliston and Queensferry.

Education

Balerno Community High School  provides secondary education for local children of S1 to A6 age groups and was founded in 1983.

Dean Park Primary School is the local primary school and is located in the south of Balerno. The current school was built in 1972.

Harmeny School is a grant-aided special school for primary school aged children with social, emotional and behavioural difficulties that was established in 1958. As well as new buildings, part of the school occupies the former Mansfield House, a Category B listed Scottish Arts and Crafts style house. The house was designed by Dunn & Findlay in 1898 and then substantially altered between 1906/1907 by Robert Lorimer.

Religious Sites

Balerno has two churches (the parish church and St Mungo's Church). 

Balerno Parish Church is part of the Church of Scotland. The church was designed in a Gothic style by James Graham Fairley and completed in 1888. It is Category C listed, rectangular in shape and composed of sandstone and Ashlar. It was originally designed as a church for a United Presbyterian congregation.

St Mungo's Church is part of the Scottish Episcopal Church. The church was designed by Robert Rowand Anderson and completed in 1869. The church is finished in white harling and is Category B listed.

The nearby former St Joseph's Catholic Church closed in August 2006, with the building purchased by Balerno Parish Church and renamed "The St Joseph's Centre".

Sport
Balerno is home to Currie RFC, who play at Malleny Park. Currie won the Scottish Rugby Union Scottish Premiership Division One in 2007 and 2010.

Balerno Bowling Club situated in the heart of the village dates back to 1885, plays lawn bowls in the Water of Leith league, Edinburgh & Leith Bowling Association.

Media
C&B News is a volunteer-led community news magazine (in digital and print formats) covering Balerno as well as nearby Currie, Juniper Green, Baberton and Colinton. Launched in February 1976, and published 10 times a year, the publication features local news and articles, reports from local groups/organisations, political representatives and Community Councils, as well as coverage of local planning applications and developments.

Notable people
Neil Alexander - Scottish footballer (goalkeeper)
Craig Gordon - Scottish footballer (goalkeeper)
Graham Moodie - Scottish field hockey player
Peter Heatly - Scottish diver and ex-Chairman of the Commonwealth Games Federation
Nina Nesbitt - Scottish singer-songwriter and guitarist
Boards of Canada - brothers Marcus and Michael Sandison, musicians
Christ. (musician) - formerly part of Hexagon Sun Collective with Boards of Canada
Michael Deacon - political sketch writer for Daily Telegraph
Chris Grassick - Scotland and Great Britain field hockey player
Paul Research and John Mackie (brothers), musicians and founders of the post-punk band The Scars rehearsed and first performed at Balerno Scout Hall.
Andrew Wilson (economist) - Economist and former MSP.

References

External links 
Balerno Community Council
Malleny Gardens
Balerno Music Festival
St Mungo's Church
Balerno Village Screen
Balerno Parish Church
Balerno Village Trust
Balerno Scouts

Areas of Edinburgh